My Runway is a South Korean streaming television series directed by Heo Chan. It stars Park Ji-yeon, Kang Dong-ho, Kang Chul-woong, Ahn Bo-hyun, Hak Jin, and Jo Hye-ryung. The series aired from December 20 to December 31, 2016, consisting of six episodes.

Plot 
Han Seo Yeon (Ji-Yeon) is a bright, healthy, and outgoing high school student who dreams of becoming a model, but she's worried about being rejected due to her height. She then applies to a fashion show, in which Jin-wook (Kang Dong-ho), who is one of the top male models in Korea, is part of the approval board.

When Han Seo Yeon and Jin-wook meet each other at the fashion model show's casting, Jin-wook harshly treats Seo Yeon because he thinks she's too short for a model, and he doesn't want to deceive her by allowing her to pass at the casting, only to be eliminated from the show at a later point for entertainment purposes, and she leaves the audition disappointed.

Then, to cheer her up, her childhood friend Na-rae (Kisum) takes her to a karaoke bar to lift up her spirits.

In a strange coincidence, Jin-wook, who got fired from the fashion show's approval board, is also in the bar celebrating his friend's birthday, then later an incident occurs where Jin-wook and Seo Yeon switch bodies after being electrocuted during a storm. They must find a way to switch their bodies back without getting caught by their friends.

Cast 
 Park Ji-yeon as Han Seo-yeon
 Kang Dong-ho as Na Jin-wook
 Kang Chul-woong as Yoon Jae-bum
 Ahn Bo-hyun as Wang Rim
 Hak Jin as Yang Chun-sik
 Jo Hye-ryung as Park Na-rae
 Jo Jae-yoon as Claude Bong

Episodes

References

External links 
 

2016 South Korean television series debuts
2016 South Korean television series endings
2010s comedy-drama television series
2010s romantic comedy television series
Korean-language Netflix exclusive international distribution programming
South Korean comedy-drama television series
South Korean romantic comedy television series
South Korean romantic fantasy television series
South Korean web series
Fiction about body swapping
Modeling-themed television series